Dakpo Tashi Namgyal (Dakpo Paṇchen Tashi Namgyel) (1511, 1512, or 1513–1587) was a lineage holder of the Dagpo Kagyu lineage of Tibetan Buddhism. He was also trained in the Sakya lineage, and "was renowned as both a scholar and yogi."

He should not be confused with his namesake, also known as Kunkyen Tashi Namgyal, (1399–1458), who helped establish Penpo Nalendra Monastery in 1425 with Sakya master Rongton Sheja Kunrig (1367–1449).
 Later in life he served as chief abbot of the Kagyu Daklha Gampo Monastery in southern Tibet.

His "most famous works" were two Mahamudra texts, Moonlight of Mahamudra and Clarifying the Natural State.  The latter is a meditation manual which
"sketches the path of meditation from the initial steps of the general and specific preliminaries ...," focusing on "the establishment and stabilisation of mindfulness and calm, through shamatha practice, and developing analytical understanding through vipashyana techniques." 
As of 2012, some of his works were available in Tibetan in the "Rigpa Dorje Practice Series."

"Much of what we know about Tashi Namgyal and his reincarnations has come from an account written down by Lama Trinle Choedak, the personal tutor of the 6th Zimwock Rinpoche."

He was one of the teachers of Mikyö Dorje, the 8th Karmapa Lama.

Works

Translated into English

In Tibetan

References

External links 
Flyer for 2009 teaching on Clarifying the Natural State

1510s births
1587 deaths
Dagpo Kagyu
Sakya lamas
Scholars of Buddhism from Tibet
Tibetan Buddhism writers
Tibetan people